Net-C (also known as NetCourrier) is a French webmail service created and run by Mail Object, a company based in Saint-Maur-des-Fossés, in Val-de-Marne.

Services and Systems 
Net-C offers webmail, synchronisation with many protocols (POP, IMAP, Exchange ActiveSync, etc.), a calendar offering, and file storage. Mobile apps are also available (iOS, Android et Windows Phone).

Protection against malware, spam and phishing attempts is offered through a partnership with specialist company Vade Secure. The webmail also provides an auto-unsubcribe button for newsletters.

Offer and economic model 
Net-C works as a freemium software. The free tier gives free email addresses, 5 aliases, 500 MB of cloud storage while displaying ads in the webmail interface. The paid tier cost €1 per month and give 100 aliases, 10 GB cloud storage and no ads on the webmail. It also offers plan aimed toward families, associations, and public bodies.

Apart from its webmail service, Net-C sells domain names and website hosting.

Positioning 
Net-C advertises itself as the protector of the personal data of its users. All data is hosted on servers located in France by Écritel.

See also 
 Webmail

References

Products introduced in 1998
Internet technology companies of France
Webmail